is one of Finland's two prominent tabloid size evening newspaper and the second largest paper in the country. Its counterpart and biggest rival is Iltalehti.

According to the National Media Research  done in 2019 Ilta-Sanomat is also the biggest digital media in Finland and reaches about 2,5 million Finns.

Johanna Lahti has been the editor-in-chief of Ilta-Sanomat since November 2019, after the previous editor-in-chief Tapio Sadeoja retired after 38 years in office.

History and profile
The paper was established in 1932 as afternoon edition of Helsingin Sanomat. In 1949 it became a separate newspaper and was named Ilta-Sanomat.

Its sister paper is Helsingin Sanomat and both papers are part of Sanoma. Ilta-Sanomat is published in tabloid format six times per week. The paper has an independent political stance.

Circulation
The circulation of Ilta-Sanomat was 212,854 copies in 1993, making it the second largest newspaper in Finland after its sister paper Helsingin Sanomat. In the period of 1995-1996 the paper had a circulation of 213,600 copies. 

Ilta-Sanomat had a circulation of 215,000 copies in 2000. Its circulation was 218,829 copies in 2001, making it the second most read paper in the country. In 2002 it had a circulation of 214,610 copies on weekdays and 243,443 copies in weekends. It was again the second best selling newspaper with a circulation of 205,000 copies in 2003. Next year the circulation of the paper was down to 201,000 copies.

The paper had a circulation of 195,673 copies in 2005, and of 186,462 copies in 2006. Its circulation was 176,531 copies in 2007. The circulation of Ilta-Sanomat was 161,615 copies in 2008 and 152,948 copies in 2009. It was 150,351 copies in 2010 and 143,321 copies in 2011.

In 2010 the online version of Ilta-Sanomat was the second most visited website in Finland in 2010 and was visited by 1,823,956 people per week.

Editors-in-chief

 Johanna Lahti 2019–
Reijo Ruokanen ?-2010
Tapio Sadeoja 2007–2019
Hannu Savola 2006–2007
Antti-Pekka Pietilä 2003–2006
Vesa-Pekka Koljonen 1984–2003
Martti Huhtamäki 1974–1983
Olavi Aarrejärvi 1966–1973
Heikki Tikkanen 1961–1966
Teo Mertanen 1956–1961
Eero Petäjäniemi 1949–1956
Yrjö Niiniluoto 1938–1949  (also the editor-in-chief Helsingin Sanomat)
Eljas Erkko 1932–1938 (also the editor-in-chief Helsingin Sanomat)

See also
List of newspapers in Finland

References

External links
 

1932 establishments in Finland
Publications established in 1932
Daily newspapers published in Finland
Finnish-language newspapers
Newspapers published in Helsinki